Huang Yi (born September 13, 1979) is a Chinese actress and singer. She graduated from the TV Film Department of the Shanghai Institute of Oriental Culture.

Filmography

Film

TV series

Discography

References

External links 

 
  Huang Yi's page on Sina.com
  Huang Yi's blog on Sina.com

1979 births
Living people
Chinese film actresses
Singers from Shanghai
Chinese television actresses
Actresses from Shanghai
21st-century Chinese actresses
Chinese Mandopop singers
20th-century Chinese actresses
21st-century Chinese women singers